Petropolis: Aerial Perspectives on the Alberta Tar Sands is a Canadian short documentary film, directed by Peter Mettler and released in 2009. The film provides an aerial view of the environmental destruction wrought by the Alberta oil sands project.

The first film ever produced by Greenpeace Canada, it premiered at the 2009 Toronto International Film Festival, before having a limited theatrical run in January 2010. It was released on DVD in April 2010.

The film was a Genie Award nominee for Best Short Documentary at the 30th Genie Awards in 2010.

References

External links

2009 films
2009 short documentary films
Canadian short documentary films
English-language Canadian films
Films directed by Peter Mettler
Documentary films about environmental issues
2000s Canadian films